Kan is a surname of multiple origins.

Origins
As a Chinese surname, Kan may be a spelling of the pronunciation in different varieties of Chinese of the following surnames, listed based on their Pinyin spelling (which reflects the Mandarin Chinese pronunciation):
 Kàn
 Gān, spelled Kan in the older Wade–Giles romanisation
 Jiǎn, spelled Kan based on its Cantonese or Hokkien pronunciation
 Jìn, spelled Kan based on its Cantonese pronunciation

The Dutch surname Kan originated both as an occupational surname for a potter or pewterer (from Middle Dutch , 'tankard', 'flagon', 'pitcher'), and as a reduced form of van de Kan, possibly a toponymic surname referring to De Kan in Veurne.

As a Japanese surname, Kan may be written using multiple kanji (e.g. ).

As a Jewish surname, Kan is one of many variants of Cohen.

As a Korean surname, Kan is the Yale Romanization and McCune–Reischauer spelling of the uncommon surname spelled in the Revised Romanization as Gan. The hanja for this surname is same one which is used to write the Chinese surname Jiǎn mentioned above. Additionally, Kan may be a  transcription of the common Korean surname Kang via the Kontsevich system spelling in the Cyrillic alphabet. This spelling can be found among ethnic Koreans from the former Soviet Union (Koryo-saram and Sakhalin Koreans).

Kan is also a Turkish surname.

Statistics
In the Netherlands, there were 518 people with the surname Kan as of 2007, up from 246 in 1947. The increase is partly attributable to immigration from China and from Turkey.

According to statistics cited by Patrick Hanks, 715 people on the island of Great Britain and five on the island of Ireland bore the surname Kan as of 2011. In 1881 there had been seven people in Great Britain with the surname Kan, primarily at Middlesex.

The 2010 United States Census found 3,005 people with the surname Kan, making it the 10,647th-most-common name in the country. This represented an increase from 2,705 (10,816th most-common) in the 2000 Census. In both censuses, about four-fifths of the bearers of the surname identified as Asian, and one-tenth as White. It was the 453rd-most-common surname among respondents to the 2000 Census who identified as Asian.

People with this name

Surname 闞 (阚)
 Kan Qingzi (born 1988), Chinese actress
 Kan Xuan (born 1972), Chinese visual artist
 Kan Ze (died 243), official of the state of Eastern Wu

Surname 菅
 Kazunori Kan (born 1985), Japanese football midfielder
 Naoto Kan (born 1946), Japanese Prime Minister
, Japanese writer

Surname 簡
 Billy Kan (born ), Hong Kong billionaire businessman
 Brian Kan (1937–2022), Hong Kong horse trainer
 Kan Fook-yee (born 1936), Hong Kong surveyor
 Hok Hoei Kan (1881–1951), Dutch East Indies landowner
 Masayoshi Kan (born 1972), Japanese sprinter
 Kan Mi-youn (born 1982), South Korean singer
 Raymond Kan (born 1932), Hong Kong architect
 Kan Ting Chiu (born 1946), Singaporean judge
 Victor Kan (born 1941), Hong Kong martial artist
 Willy Kan (1978–1999), Hong Kong jockey
 Kan Yuet-keung, Hong Kong banker
 Yuet Wai Kan (born 1936), Hong Kong-born American medical scientist

Other
 Kán, a Hungarian noble family 
 Aleksander Kan (1925–2017), Russian-born Swedish history professor
 Alexander Rinnooy Kan (born 1949), Dutch mathematician

 Dan Kan (executive), American technology executive
 Daniel Kan (1927–2013), Dutch mathematician
 Derek Kan, American business executive and government official
 Francisco Luna Kan (born 1925), Mexican politician
 Gene Kan (1976–2002), British-born American computer programmer
 Georges Kan (born 1958), French musicologist
 Ilya Kan (1909–1978), Soviet chess player
 Justin Kan (born 1983), American internet entrepreneur
 Raybon Kan (born 1996), New Zealand comedian
 Ravza Kavakçı Kan (born 1972), Turkish politician,
 Sergei Kan, Soviet-born American anthropologist
 Shiu-Kay Kan (born 1951), Hong Kong-born British architect
 Suna Kan (born 1946), Turkish violinist
 Toni Kan (born 1971), Nigerian writer
 Valery Kan (born 1978), Russian politician
 Victoria Kan (born 1995), Russian tennis player
 Wim Kan (1911–1983), Dutch cabaret artist
 Yo Kan (born 1978), Chinese-born Japanese table tennis player
 Yue-Sai Kan (born 1949), Chinese-born American television host

See also
 Kan (disambiguation)
 Kahn (German surname)
 Khan (name)

References

Chinese-language surnames
Multiple Chinese surnames